Funyuns is the brand name of an onion-flavored corn extruded snack introduced in the United States in 1969, and invented by Frito-Lay employee George Wade Bigner. Funyuns consist primarily of cornmeal, ring-shaped using an extrusion process, representing the shape of fried onion rings. A salt and onion mix gives them their flavor. They are a product of PepsiCo's Frito-Lay company. In Brazil, Funyuns are sold under the name "Cebolitos".

History
They were named "Funyuns" by University of North Texas professor and copywriter Jim Albright after it was discovered that the first choice of name for the product, "OnYums," was a registered trademark of Rudolph Foods. Initial television advertising for the snack featured a variation of Susan Christie's 1966 song, "I Love Onions."

Over the years, several recipes have come out that use Funyuns as an ingredient, including one using the product as a replacement for fried onions in green bean casserole and using the crushed snack food as a Thanksgiving turkey coating.

Flavors
 Original Funyuns (1969–present)
 Wasabi (2001–2002)
 Flamin' Hot (2007–present)
 Chilli & Limón (2014–2018)
 Steakhouse Onion (2015–2018)

See also
 List of brand name snack foods

References

External links

 
 "Funyun Philosophy" cooking tips inspired by Funyuns by Charles Lam, Feb 22, 2011

Products introduced in 1969
Brand name snack foods
Frito-Lay brands
Onion-based foods